Fant (The Gypsy) is a Norwegian film from 1937 based on Gabriel Scott's 1928 novel of the same name. The film was directed by Tancred Ibsen, who was also wrote the script for the film. The film premiered on December 26, 1937 at the Eldorado Cinema in Oslo.

The film is about a young orphaned girl Josefa (played by Sonja Wigert), who escapes from her wicked uncle (played by Einar Tveito) and eventually falls in love with a Roma named Fændrik (played by Alfred Maurstad). Fændrik belongs to a seafaring group of Roma that travel around Southern Norway, and in many ways the film is typical of the contemporary view of the Roma people and their culture.

Guri Stormoen, who played the role of Mathilde, said that during the production her opponent Alfred Maurstad had stabbed her in the stomach with a knife during the filming of a fight scene, and that director Ibsen had ordered the actors to "fight seriously, otherwise it would look idiotic, of course. And with that, we had to yell at each other, and then—it was absolutely awful!" The actors had to lie in their beds the day after this scene was filmed, according to Stormoen, because they were battered and full of bruises.

Fant was received well by both the critics and the public when it was released, and Alfred Maurstad in particular was praised for his role as the ruthless layabout Fændrik.

Cast
 Alfred Maurstad as Fændrik 
 Sonja Wigert as Josefa
 Lars Tvinde as Sebaldus
 Guri Stormoen as Mathilde
 Oscar Egede-Nissen as Oscar
 Henny Skjønberg as Tobine
 Carsten Winger as Halvor
 Marit Halset as Halvor's wife
 Sigurd Magnussøn as Peder
 Karin Meyer as Peder's wife
 Toralv Maurstad as a boy
 Espen Skjønberg as a boy
 Joachim Holst-Jensen as Uncle Søren
 Gøril Havrevold as Johanne
 Abigael Magnussøn as Johanne's mother
 Eugen Skjønberg as the sheriff
 Einar Tveito as Josefa's uncle
 Gudrun Tvinde as a fisherwoman
 Aagot Didriksen as a farmwoman

Sequel
Leif Sinding made a sequel to Tancred Ibsen's Fant in 1943 or 1944. This sequel was titled Fant II or Josepha. However, the film was never released, and only fragments of it have been preserved.

Literature
The film found is discussed in Thor Gotaas's comprehensive 2003 work Taterne: livskampen og eventyret (Travelers: The Struggle for Life and the Adventure), in which the author discusses the extent to which the film—and Gabriel Scott's novel of the same name—provides an authentic image of Roma culture.

References

External links
 
 Fant at the National Library of Norway
 Fant at the Swedish Film Database

Norwegian drama films
1937 drama films
Norwegian black-and-white films
Films directed by Tancred Ibsen
1930s Norwegian-language films